The Mausoleum of Imam Hasan of Basra is a historic shrine in Basra commemorating the renowned ulama Hasan of Basra. Hasan of Basra was a Sunni Islamic ulama, nicknamed as Abi Sayeed, born two years before the end of the era of the second Caliph Umar. The mausoleum is located in the Zubayr district where many cemeteries are situated.

The mausoleum contains the tomb of Hasan and Ibn Sirin, and the building is topped with a conical domed tower decorated by engravings. The tower was built in 1185 by the 34th Abbasid Caliph Al-Nasir, constructed in Seljuk architectural style, with the lower part of the tower having larger diameter than the upper part. At the northern part of the tomb, there are two pillars with plaster paintings. Next to the tomb is a room containing the grave of Al-Naqib family. The shrine of Hasan is made of marble stones. A small prayer room also serves as a mosque.

See also

 Islam in Iraq
 List of mosques in Iraq

References

12th-century mosques
Abbasid architecture
Mausoleums in Iraq
Seljuk architecture
Sunni Islamic holy places